Kiss of the Dragon (Le Baiser mortel du dragon in French) is a 2001 French-American action film directed by Chris Nahon, written and produced by French filmmaker Luc Besson, and starring an international cast of Jet Li, Bridget Fonda, and Tchéky Karyo.

Li purposefully wanted to take a realistic approach to the fight scenes, and forgo the CGI and wire work that had been popularized by films such as Charlie’s Angels and The Matrix. It is notable as most of the action sequences did not use CGI or wire work; only two scenes required CGI enhancement and only one scene involved wire work.

Plot
Liu Jian (Jet Li), a Chinese intelligence agent, is sent to Paris to help the French authorities apprehend Chinese mob boss Mr. Big (Ric Young), who is involved in heroin smuggling. He meets Inspector Jean-Pierre Richard (Tchéky Karyo), a corrupt and violent police detective, at a hotel. Richard tricks Liu into believing he is simply providing reconnaissance of a meet involving Mr. Big. During the operation, Mr. Big is introduced to two female prostitutes, one being Jessica Kamen (Bridget Fonda), an American woman, who he takes back to his room for sex. While Liu and the rest are watching through the surveillance camera, Mr. Big kicks everyone out except for the two women. After pretending to seduce him, the other prostitute stabs Mr. Big. Overseeing the events from another room, Liu rushes in and subdues the prostitute. He then attempts to call for help to save Mr. Big's life, but Richard enters shortly after, shooting Mr. Big and the woman with Liu's police-issued handgun, framing Liu for both murders. Jessica hides in the bathroom during the commotion.

Realizing he has been set up, Liu manages to escape from the hotel with a surveillance tape showing Richard shooting Mr. Big. After the events, Chinese liaisons are sent to France to investigate the matter, as Richard makes Liu the primary suspect. However, the liaisons do not believe the story Richard provides. Liu meets with one of them on a ferry and passes him the tape, revealing the truth. However, Richard's men spot them, and the liaison is assassinated. Liu is then forced to flee from a horde of cops and GIGN commandos. After Liu escapes, he is forced to maintain a low profile.

While his situation worsens, he meets Jessica, whose daughter was kidnapped by Richard to force her into prostitution. Liu discovers that Jessica was the second prostitute at the hotel during the night of Mr. Big's murder. He realizes she can prove his innocence, but she refuses to go without retrieving her daughter, Isabel (Isabelle Duhauvelle). Liu decides the tape would provide the best evidence, and sends Jessica to Richard's office to steal the tape. Jessica manages to get the tape, then Liu and Jessica head to an orphanage where Isabel is kept. However, Richard anticipates this move, and ambushes the duo at the orphanage. During their escape, Jessica is shot in the chest. Liu manages to get her to the hospital in time and leaves for the police station, driven to retrieve her daughter.

Liu arrives at the police station where Richard is holding Isabel hostage and he fights his way through another horde of policemen. After managing to defeat Richard's personal henchmen, Liu enters his office and finds him holding Isabel at gunpoint. Even though Liu is unarmed, he tells Richard that if he kills Isabel, then he will have all the time he needs to kill him. Richard tries to kill Liu, but he only manages to shoot him in the shoulder. However, the bullet injury fails to prevent Liu from disarming Richard while sticking an acupuncture needle into the back of his neck, in a forbidden location known as the "kiss of the dragon," which stimulates all the body's blood to travel to the brain to cause a painful death by brain aneurysm. Richard suffers and dies from the "kiss of the dragon" just as Liu departs with Isabel. Returning to Jessica's hospital bedside, Liu removes an acupuncture needle from Jessica's neck, promptly waking her. Upon waking up, she happily finds Isabel peacefully sleeping by her side.

Origin of title
The title "Kiss of the Dragon" is derived from one of the last scenes in the movie, in which Liu punctures Richard in the back of the neck with an acupuncture needle at a "very forbidden" point on the body. The puncture itself, called "kiss of the dragon", traps all the body's blood in the head and causes side effects of quadriplegia, bleeding from the head's orifices, and a painful death by brain aneurysm.

Cast
 Jet Li as Inspector Liu "Johnny" Jian 
 Bridget Fonda as Jessica Kamen
 Tchéky Karyo as Inspector Jean-Pierre Richard
 Ric Young as "Mr. Big" Sung
 Burt Kwouk as Uncle Tai
 Max Ryan as Lupo
 Kentaro as Chen
 Laurence Ashley as Aja
 Cyril Raffaelli as Twin
 Didier Azoulay as Twin
 John Forgeham as Inspector Max
 Paul Barrett as Pilot
 Colin Prince as Lupo's Assistant
 Vincent Glo as "Pluto"
 Vincent Wong as Minister Tang
 Isabelle Duhauvelle as Isabel Kamen
 Affif Ben Badra as Lupo's Henchman (uncredited)

Production
The director filmed most of the action sequences without CGI or wire work; only two scenes required CGI enhancement and only one scene involved wire work. Wire work was added to one of the last fight sequences between Li and Cyril Raffaelli, in order to add clarity to Raffaelli's kicks, as he was moving too fast for the camera. Nahon had to slow down this fight scene, as both Li and Raffaelli were moving too quickly to be captured clearly at normal recording speed.

The French version of the film is notably different from others; it contains a zoomed-out shot of Tcheky Karyo shooting one of his henchmen in the head, resulting in a fountain of blood erupting. This passage was cropped from most international versions of the movie.

Reception
The film received mixed reviews from critics, who thought violence overwhelmed it at the expense of the story and even a true portrayal of martial arts. 
On Rotten Tomatoes the film has an approval rating of 52% based on reviews from 108 critics. The site's consensus states "A formulaic actioner that's sure to please action fans. Those looking for plot, believability, or character development will have difficulty finding them." 
On Metacritic it has a score of 58 out of 100, based on 26 critic reviews, indicating "mixed or average reviews".
Audiences surveyed by CinemaScore gave the film a grade B+ on scale of A to F.

Roger Ebert of the Chicago Sun-Times gave the film 3 out of 4 stars, and wrote: "I like the movie on a simple physical level. There is no deeper meaning and no higher skill involved; just professional action, well-staged and filmed with a certain stylistic elegance." The film is based on a story by Li, and is one of Fonda's final on-screen appearances before her retirement from acting.

Due to its violence, Kiss of the Dragon was banned in China. Li spoke out about this censorship.

Box office
Kiss of the Dragon opened at 2,025 North American theaters on July 6, 2001 to an opening weekend gross of $13,304,027 ($6,569 per screen). It went on to a total North American gross of $36,845,124, making the film to be very profitable for 20th Century Fox (which only paid slightly more than $12.5 million to acquire the distribution rights in North America and some other foreign territories).

Its total worldwide box office gross is $64,437,847.

The film was set to be the first film in the United States to receive an R-rating to be available on Disney+ on April 29, 2022, but eventually the decision was dropped, and the film will instead be streaming in Canada only.

Trivia
 There are conflicting informations about the given name of the Protagonist portrayed by Li. His surname is Liu, his given name is mostly Jian, be it in the Internet Movie Database, Fandom, but also on DVD and Blu-ray covers. However, the Antagonist Jean-Pierre Richard calls him twice by his full name, which appears in the subtitles in all languages as Liu Ciu-jian (in Pinyin style without hyphenation Ciujian).
 In an interview for the Los Angeles premiere on June 25, 2001, Fonda stated that she did not like to work with the actor who portrayed the taller twin, Didier Azoulay, because in one scene he grabs her character Jessica on her neck, lifts her into the air and choke her, which Azoulay did too roughly. In the same interview, Li emphasizes how important Fonda's character is to the plot. He said in normal action films the girl is like a flower that can appear, disappear and reappear when wanted, without having any important meaning. Jessica, however, would be the key between the good guy Liu and the bad guy Richard, and she would make the whole story work.

Soundtrack
 

The soundtrack was released on July 3, 2001 through Virgin Records, and consisted mainly of a blend of hip hop and electronic music.

 "Mystikal Fever" – 3:49 (Mystikal)
 "Lapdance" – 3:33 (N.E.R.D)
 "Aerodynamic" – 3:35 (Daft Punk and Slum Village)
 "Fuck That" – 3:17 (Bathgate)
 "What You Got?" – 4:19 (Chino XL)
 "Sing" – 4:41 (Mouse)
 "Cheatin'" – 3:46 (Liberty City)
 "Don't Blame It on I" – 4:05 (The Congos)
 "Ghir Dini" – 3:59 (Assia)
 "As If You Said Nothing" – 4:38 (Craig Armstrong)
 "Adore You" – 4:21 (Lisa Barbuscia)

References

External links
 
 
 

2001 films
2001 action films
2001 directorial debut films
2001 martial arts films
2000s chase films
20th Century Fox films
American action films
American martial arts films
English-language French films
EuropaCorp films
French action films
Films about organized crime in France
Films about prostitution in Paris
Films produced by Luc Besson
Films scored by Craig Armstrong (composer)
Films set in Paris
Films shot in Paris
Films with screenplays by Luc Besson
Films with screenplays by Robert Mark Kamen
StudioCanal films
Films directed by Chris Nahon
2000s American films
2000s French films